Potanichthys is a fossil genus of flying or gliding fish found in deposits in China dating to the Ladinian age of the Middle Triassic epoch  (237 to 228 million years ago). However, the fossil is not related to modern flying fish, which evolved independently about 66 million years ago. It is classified under the extinct family Thoracopteridae of the order Perleidiformes. It contains only one species, Potanichthys xingyiensis.

See also
Thoracopterus

References

External links
New flying fish fossils discovered in China BBC, 31 October 2012.

Middle Triassic fish
Triassic bony fish
Fossil taxa described in 2012
Peltopleuriformes
Prehistoric ray-finned fish genera
Prehistoric fish of Asia
Prehistoric animals of China